Wells was a rural district in Somerset, England, from 1894 to 1974.  

It was created in 1894 under the Local Government Act 1894, taking over the responsibilities of the former Wells Rural Sanitary District. Each parish elected one or more councillors:

In 1904 the parish of Godney was formed from part of the parish of Meare.

Wells Rural District was abolished in 1974 under the Local Government Act 1972 when it became part of Mendip district.

References

Further reading
Map from Boundary Commission of  1917

Districts of England created by the Local Government Act 1894
Districts of England abolished by the Local Government Act 1972
History of Somerset
Local government in Somerset
Rural districts of England